Senegal competed at the 2020 Summer Olympics in Tokyo. Originally scheduled to take place from 24 July to 9 August 2020, the Games were postponed to 23 July to 8 August 2021, because of the COVID-19 pandemic. It was the nation's fifteenth consecutive appearance at the Summer Olympics.

Competitors
The following is the list of number of competitors in the Games.

Athletics

Senegal received a universality slot from the World Athletics to send a male track and field athlete to the Olympics.

Track & road events

Canoeing

Slalom
Senegalese canoeists qualified one boat for each of the following classes through the 2021 African Canoe Slalom Championship in La Seu d'Urgell, Spain.

Fencing

Senegal entered one female fencer into the Olympic competition. Ndèye Binta Diongue claimed a spot in the women's épée by winning the final match at the African Zonal Qualifier in Cairo, Egypt.

Judo

Senegal qualified one judoka for the men's heavyweight category (+100 kg) at the Games. 2019 African Games champion Mbagnick Ndiaye accepted a continental berth from Africa as the nation's top-ranked judoka outside of direct qualifying position in the IJF World Ranking List of June 28, 2021.

Shooting

For the first time since Los Angeles 1984, Senegal granted an invitation from ISSF to send the Italian-born Chiara Costa in the women's skeet shooting to the Olympics, as long as the minimum qualifying score (MQS) was fulfilled by June 6, 2021.

Swimming

Senegal received a universality invitation from FINA to send two top-ranked swimmers (one per gender) in their respective individual events to the Olympics, based on the FINA Points System of June 28, 2021.

Table tennis
 
Senegal entered one athlete into the table tennis competition at the Games for the first time in 16 years. Ibrahima Diaw scored a semifinal victory to occupy one of the four available spots in the men's singles at the 2020 African Olympic Qualification Tournament in Tunis, Tunisia, marking the country's recurrence to the sport for the first time since 2004.

Wrestling

Senegal qualified one wrestler for the men's freestyle 65 kg into the Olympic competition, by progressing to the top two finals at the 2021 African & Oceania Qualification Tournament in Hammamet, Tunisia.

Freestyle

References

Nations at the 2020 Summer Olympics
2020
2021 in Senegalese sport